The 2020 Copa Sudamericana second stage was played from 27 October to 5 November 2020. A total of 32 teams competed in the second stage to decide the 16 places in the final stages of the 2020 Copa Sudamericana.

The second stage had been originally scheduled to be played from 19 to 28 May 2020, but was postponed due to the COVID-19 pandemic.

Draw

The draw for the second stage was held on 23 October 2020, 12:00 PYT (UTC−3). For the second stage, the teams were allocated to two pots according to their previous results in this season:
Pot 1: 10 teams transferred from the Copa Libertadores and six best winners of the first stage from the Copa Sudamericana
Pot 2: 16 remaining winners of the first stage from the Copa Sudamericana
The 32 teams were drawn into 16 ties (O1–O16) between a team from Pot 1 and a team from Pot 2, with the teams from Pot 1 hosting the second leg. Teams from the same association could be drawn into the same tie.

The following are the 10 teams transferred from the Copa Libertadores (two best teams eliminated in the third stage of qualifying and eight third-placed teams in the group stage).

The following are the 22 winners of the first stage from the Copa Sudamericana. Matches in the first stage were considered for the ranking of teams for the second stage draw.

Format

In the second stage, each tie was played on a home-and-away two-legged basis. If tied on aggregate, the away goals rule was used. If still tied, extra time was not played, and a penalty shoot-out was used to determine the winner (Regulations Article 2.4.2).

The 16 winners of the second stage advanced to the round of 16 of the final stages.

Matches
The first legs were played on 27–29 October, and the second legs were played on 3–5 November 2020.

|}

Match O1

Independiente won 2–1 on aggregate and advanced to the round of 16 (Match A).

Match O2

Tied 2–2 on aggregate, Unión won on away goals and advanced to the round of 16 (Match B).

Match O3

Tied 1–1 on aggregate, Unión La Calera won on away goals and advanced to the round of 16 (Match C).

Match O4

Universidad Católica won 2–1 on aggregate and advanced to the round of 16 (Match D).

Match O5

Tied 3–3 on aggregate, Deportivo Cali won on penalties and advanced to the round of 16 (Match E).

Match O6

Sport Huancayo won 3–2 on aggregate and advanced to the round of 16 (Match F).

Match O7

Vasco da Gama won 1–0 on aggregate and advanced to the round of 16 (Match G).

Match O8

Tied 6–6 on aggregate, Lanús won on away goals and advanced to the round of 16 (Match H).

Match O9

Bolívar won 4–2 on aggregate and advanced to the round of 16 (Match H).

Match O10

Defensa y Justicia won 3–2 on aggregate and advanced to the round of 16 (Match G).

Match O11

Coquimbo Unido won 5–0 on aggregate and advanced to the round of 16 (Match F).

Match O12

Tied 1–1 on aggregate, Vélez Sarsfield won on away goals and advanced to the round of 16 (Match E).

Match O13

River Plate won 4–2 on aggregate and advanced to the round of 16 (Match D).

Match O14

Junior won 1–0 on aggregate and advanced to the round of 16 (Match C).

Match O15

Bahia won 4–1 on aggregate and advanced to the round of 16 (Match B).

Match O16

Fénix won 4–2 on aggregate and advanced to the round of 16 (Match A).

Notes

References

External links
CONMEBOL Sudamericana 2020, CONMEBOL.com

2
October 2020 sports events in South America
November 2020 sports events in South America